Daknisa (Kaitag: Даӏхънисса; Dargwa: Дяхъниса) is a rural locality (a selo) in Dzhirabachinsky Selsoviet, Kaytagsky District, Republic of Dagestan, Russia. The population was 437 as of 2010. There are 3 streets.

Geography 
Daknisa is located 14 km southwest of Madzhalis (the district's administrative centre) by road. Dzhirabachi and Surgiya are the nearest rural locality.

Nationalities 
Dargins live there.

References 

Rural localities in Kaytagsky District